The 1950 Stanley Cup Finals was contested by the New York Rangers and the Detroit Red Wings. It was the Rangers' first appearance in the Finals since their Stanley Cup victory in 1940. The Red Wings would win the series 4–3 to mark their franchise's fourth Cup win, and first since 1943.

This was the last Stanley Cup Finals to feature a team that did not host any games and also the last to feature neutral site games until . The neutral site games were held in Toronto on account of scheduling conflicts at Madison Square Garden.

Paths to the Finals
New York defeated the Montreal Canadiens 4–1 to reach the Finals. Detroit defeated the three-time defending champion Toronto Maple Leafs (who had swept the Red Wings in the Finals two years running) 4–3 to reach the Finals.

Game summaries
Two games were played in Toronto as the circus had taken over Madison Square Garden in New York. New York's Don Raleigh scored two overtime winners and Pete Babando scored the Cup-winning goal in double overtime of game seven, the first time ever in which the Stanley Cup was won in extra frames in game seven. Detroit won the Cup without Gordie Howe, injured in the first game of the playoffs. 

As Stanley Cup runner-up, the Rangers were awarded the O'Brien Cup, and they became the last team to win this trophy, which was retired after the season. Originally, the O'Brien Cup was the championship trophy of the National Hockey Association, the NHL's precursor, and later awarded to the NHL champion before the league took over control of the Stanley Cup in 1927.

Series

Stanley Cup engraving
The 1950 Stanley Cup was presented to Red Wings captain Sid Abel by NHL President Clarence Campbell following the Red Wings 4–3 double overtime win over the Rangers in game seven.

The following Red Wings players and staff had their names engraved on the Stanley Cup

1949–50 Detroit Red Wings

See also
 1949–50 NHL season

Notes

References
 
 

Stanley Cup
Stanley Cup Finals
Detroit Red Wings games
New York Rangers games
Ice hockey competitions in Detroit
Ice hockey competitions in Toronto
Stanley Cup Finals
Stanley Cup Finals
Stanley Cup Finals
Stanley Cup Finals
Stanley Cup Finals
1950s in Toronto